The Ruger Old Army is a black-powder percussion revolver introduced in 1972 by the Sturm, Ruger company and manufactured through 2008.  Models were made with a 7.5" and a 5.5 inch barrel.

Design
The Ruger Old Army revolver is unusual in that, unlike most percussion revolvers on the market, it was not based on a historical design, but was a modification of Ruger's Blackhawk model, which was itself based upon the cartridge-firing Colt Peacemaker.  The Old Army revolver accordingly incorporates many modern design features, though employing antiquated black-powder component loading.

This design was built around the Blackhawk, but it takes its styling cues from the Spiller and Burr cap and ball pistol. This is due to the frame being longer in front to accommodate the loading lever and pivot pin. Earlier models listed as .44 caliber, later as .45, but all use a .457” round balls or .454” conical bullets of pure lead.

Unlike the Blackhawk, the Old Army did not make use of Ruger's transfer bar safety; instead the revolver relied upon a series of safety notches between each chamber on the cylinder like some models of the remington/colt or other black powder revolvers of the mid-19th century had.

The revolver was tested by loading each chamber to capacity with Bullseye smokeless powder and a lead ball. While this might result in catastrophic failure in other firearms, the Old Army proved to be strong enough to handle the pressure.

Variants
The Old Army was made in blued steel and stainless steel. Originally fitted with adjustable sights, fixed-sight models were first offered in 1994. A 5-½ inch barrel was introduced in 2002. Some versions were sold with polymer ivory grips.

References

Ruger revolvers
Black-powder pistols
Weapons and ammunition introduced in 1972